F. Scott Fitzgerald (1896–1940) was an American author.

Francis Fitzgerald may also refer to:

 Francis Fitzgerald (cricketer) (1864–1939), Australian cricketer and barrister
 Frank FitzGerald (judge), American football player and judge
 Francis Alan Fitzgerald (born 1949), musician
 Francis Alexander FitzGerald (1806–1897), Irish barrister and judge
 Francis Joseph Fitzgerald (1869–1911), commander of the Royal Northwest Mounted Police
 Francis Fitzgerald (fl. 1952), founder of WEAL

See also
 Frances FitzGerald (disambiguation)
 Frank Fitzgerald (disambiguation)
 Frankie Fitzgerald (born 1985), British actor